PICMG 2.4 is a specification by PICMG that standardizes user IO pin mappings from ANSI/VITA standard IP sites to J3/P3, J4/P4, and J5/P5 on a CompactPCI backplane.

Status
Adopted: 9 September 1998

Current revision: 1.0

References

Open standards
PICMG standards